Branover is a Jewish surname. Notable people with the name include:

 David Stitchkin Branover, Chilean attorney and University President
 Herman Branover, Russian-Israeli author and publisher

References 

Jewish surnames